Clem McCarthy (September 9, 1882 – June 4, 1962) was an American sportscaster and public address announcer. He also lent his voice to Pathe News's RKO newsreels. He was known for his gravelly voice and dramatic style, a "whiskey tenor" as sports announcer and executive David J. Halberstam has called it.

Early years
McCarthy was born Charles Louis McCarthy in East Bloomfield, New York. His father's work as a dealer and auctioneer of horses gave the young McCarthy frequent access to horse fairs and race tracks across the United States. Although he wanted to be a jockey, he grew too big and instead began reporting on horse writing in Southern California in the 1920s.

Career 
As Halberstam's book Sports on New York Radio notes, McCarthy is considered one of horse racing's great callers, setting the stage for well-known voices from Cawood Ledford to Dave Johnson. He was the first public-address announcer at a major American racetrack, Arlington Park in Arlington Heights, Illinois. Installation of a public address system there in 1927 provided that opportunity.

In addition to being a race caller for racetracks and NBC Radio, he was a top boxing announcer, too. His most often replayed boxing sportscast is probably his NBC radio call of the 1938 Joe Louis-Max Schmeling rematch at Yankee Stadium:

Louis, right and left to the head, a left to the jaw, a right to the head, and [referee Art] Donovan is watching carefully. Louis measures him. Right to the body, a left up to the jaw, and Schmeling is down! The count is five! Five, six, seven, eight -- the men are in the ring! The fight is over, on a technical knock out. Max Schmeling is beaten in one round!

Later that same year he called the famous Seabiscuit / War Admiral match race, including this phrase in the final stretch run, as Seabiscuit shocked the horse racing world by outrunning the heavily favored War Admiral:

McCarthy is also known for having mis-called the 1947 Preakness Stakes when a crowd standing on a platform blocked his view of the far turn, just as two horses with similar silks switched places. (Chic Anderson, one of McCarthy's most famous descendants as a track announcer, made a similar mistake in the 1975 Kentucky Derby.) As with Anderson later, McCarthy's quick and humble admission of the mistake helped the criticism eventually blow over. Years after McCarthy's death, sports film maker Bud Greenspan compared the audio of the race call with newsreel film of the race, and discovered that McCarthy had stated, "...and the crowd blocks me for a moment..." at the exact point where the two horses had switched places.

McCarthy's career also included work at local radio stations, beginning at KYW in Chicago in 1928. From there, he went to WMCA in New York City.

Personal life
In 1929, McCarthy married vaudeville actress Vina Smith. They had no children, and they remained married until her death in 1954. He suffered serious injury in an automobile accident in 1957, and in his final years he had Parkinson's disease.

Death
McCarthy died on June 4, 1962.

Recognition 
The National Sportscasters and Sportswriters Association inducted McCarthy into its Hall of Fame in 1970. In 1987, McCarthy was inducted into the American Sportscasters Association Hall of Fame along with veteran ABC Sports announcer Jim McKay.

In popular culture 
Comedian Doodles Weaver mimicked McCarthy in his 1948 novelty recording (with Spike Jones) of the "William Tell Overture".

Recording
Clem McCarthy, the Voice of American Sports, an LP record, was produced in 1962.

References

External links
Sportscasters Hall of Fame
Clem McCarthy calls the Joe Louis / Max Schmeling rematch, 1938
The incredible story behind Clem McCarthy's first Kentucky Derby broadcast

1882 births
1962 deaths
American horse racing announcers
American sports announcers
Boxing commentators
Sportspeople from Rochester, New York